Impact Survival Series is an American stock car enduro series based in the Upper Midwest of the United States. The annual circuit typically includes stops at race tracks in Wisconsin and Michigan.

History 
Founded in 2009 by promoter Matt Rowe, Impact Survival Series features enduro races consisting of 150–300 laps.

ISS held their first race on September 9, 2009, at Shawano Speedway. Jay Welsing was the winner and lone driver to complete all 150 laps.

Madison International Speedway is host to one of the signature races of the ISS season in the annual 2.4 Hours of Le MIS.

Race winners

References

External links 
 Impact Survival Series
 ISS resutls

Stock car racing series in the United States